Read Creek is a river in Delaware County, New York. It drains Merrick Pond and flows east until it meets the unnamed creek that drains Trask Pond, then begins flowing south receiving its other tributaries before converging with the East Branch Delaware River northeast of Fishs Eddy.

References

Rivers of New York (state)
Rivers of Delaware County, New York
Tributaries of the East Branch Delaware River